The Demon is an Angel (Spanish:Un ángel sin pudor) is a 1949 Venezuelan comedy film directed by Carlos Hugo Christensen and starring Susana Freyre, Juana Sujo and Juan Carlos Thorry.

Cast
 Susana Freyre
 Juana Sujo 
 Juan Carlos Thorry

References

Bibliography 
 Darlene J. Sadlier. Latin American Melodrama: Passion, Pathos, and Entertainment. University of Illinois Press, 2009.

External links 
 

1949 films
1949 comedy films
Venezuelan comedy films
1940s Spanish-language films
Venezuelan black-and-white films